The  is a high-speed train service operated by the East Japan Railway Company (JR East) on the  in Japan.

Rolling stock
 E7 series (from 3 March 2019)

Former rolling stock
 185 series EMUs (15 November 1982 - September 1997)
 E1 series (Max Tanigawa) (until September 2012)
 200 series 10-car "K" sets (1 October 1997 – 15 March 2013)
 E2 series 10-car sets (26 January 2013 until 17 March 2023)
 E4 series (Max Tanigawa) (until 1 October 2021)

History
The name Tanigawa (written as "谷川") was first introduced on 15 November 1982 for limited express services operating between Ueno in Tokyo and Minakami on the Jōetsu Line.

From 1 October 1997, the name (written as "たにがわ") was used for the all-stations services between Tokyo and Echigo-Yuzawa on the Jōetsu Shinkansen, replacing the previous Toki all-stations services. During the winter skiing season, trains terminate and start at the seasonal Gala-Yuzawa Station.

See also
 List of named passenger trains of Japan

References

 JR Timetable, December 2008

External links
 200 series Yamabiko/Toki/Nasuno/Tanigawa 
 E1 series Max Toki/Max Tanigawa 
 E4 series Max Toki/Max Tanigawa 

Jōetsu Shinkansen
Railway services introduced in 1982
Named Shinkansen trains